Denison is a city in Grayson County, Texas, United States,  south of the Texas–Oklahoma border. Its population was 24,479 at the 2020 and 22,682 at the 2010 censuses. Denison is part of the Texoma region and is one of two principal cities in the Sherman–Denison metropolitan statistical area. Denison is the birthplace of US President Dwight D. Eisenhower.

History
Denison was founded in 1872 in conjunction with the Missouri–Kansas–Texas Railroad (MKT) or "Katy" depot. It was named after wealthy Katy vice president George Denison. Because the town was established close to where the MKT crossed the Red River (both important conduits of transportation in the industrial era), it came to be an important commercial center in the 19th-century American West. In 1875, Doc Holliday had offices in Denison.

During the phylloxera epidemic of the mid-19th century, which destroyed the vast majority of wine grapes in Europe, Denison horticulturalist T.V. Munson pioneered methods in creating phylloxera-resistant vines, and earned induction into the French Legion of Honor, as well as sister city status for Denison and Cognac, France.

In 1901, the first electric "Interurban" railway in Texas, the Denison and Sherman Railway, was completed between Denison and Sherman.

In 1915, Kentucky-based evangelist Mordecai Ham held a revival meeting in Denison, which resulted in 1,100 professions of faith in Jesus Christ.

Denison played host to 20th-century notables such as the Marx Brothers and President Dwight D. Eisenhower, who was born on October 14, 1890, in Denison.

Geography
Denison is located in northeastern Grayson County, with the city limits extending north to the Red River, which forms the Oklahoma state line.

The city is in the center of the Texoma region, encompassing parts of Texas and Oklahoma.

Climate
Denison has a humid subtropical climate (Cfa in the Köppen climate classification).

Demographics

2020 census

As of the 2020 United States census, 24,479 people, 9,361 households, and 6,038 families were residing in the city.

2000 census
At the census of 2000,  22,773 people, 9,185 households, and 6,135 families resided in the city. The population density was 1,008.1 people per square mile (389.2/km). The 10,309 housing units had an average density of 456.3 per square mile (176.2/km). The racial makeup of the city was 84.02% White, 8.62% African American, 1.67% Native American, 0.46% Asian, 0.06% Pacific Islander, 2.19% from other races, and 2.98% from two or more races. Hispanics or Latinos of any race were 5.23% of the population.

Of the 9,185 households, 29.8% had children under  living with them, 48.1% were married couples living together, 14.4% had a female householder with no husband present, and 33.2% were not families. About 29.1% of all households were made up of individuals, and 14.4% had someone living alone who was 65 or older. The average household size was 2.43, and the average family size was 2.97.

In the city, the age distribution was 24.6% under 18, 8.8% from 18 to 24, 26.7% from 25 to 44, 22.4% from 45 to 64, and 17.4% who were 65 or older. The median age was 38 years. For every 100 females, there were 88.9 males. For every 100 females 18 and over, there were 83.7 males.

The median income for a household in the city was $31,474, and for a family was $39,820. Males had a median income of $30,459 versus $21,451 for females. The per capita income for the city was $17,685. About 11.9% of families and 14.7% of the population were below the poverty line, including 21.8% of those under 18 and 11.8% of those 65 or over.

Economy

Major employers 

Major employers in Denison include:
 Denison Independent School District
 Ruiz Foods
 Texoma Medical Center
 Cigna
 Caterpillar
 Wal-Mart Stores
 Spectrum Brands
 Anthem
 ACS Manufacturing
 Denison Industries
 City of Denison
 Grayson College
Dialogue Direct Contact Centers 
National Government Services
Champion Cooler Corporation 
SignWarehouse.com

Arts and culture

The Grayson County Frontier Village in Denison contains 11 of the oldest homes in Grayson County that were moved here for preservation.

Sports
Former minor league baseball teams include the Denison Katydids, Denison Blue Sox, Denison Champions, Denison Railroaders, and Sherman–Denison Twins.

Munson Stadium seats 5,262 people and is primarily used for football. It is the home field of Denison High School's football and soccer teams. The Denison High School football team won the 1984 Texas Class 4A State Championship by beating Tomball 27–13, completing a perfect 16–0 record. They also made appearances in the 1995, 1996, and 1997 Class 4A Division II State Championship games, losing each time to La Marque. They are home to the longest high school football rivalry in Texas: the Battle of the Ax, against Sherman High School.

Education

Denison is served by the Denison Independent School District. Denison High School opened in 2014.

Grayson College is located in Denison.  The school's T.V. Munson Viticulture and Enology Program preserves Denison's viticultural heritage.

Media

Magazine
 Texoma Living! Magazine

Newspaper
 The Herald Democrat

Radio stations
  KMAD  Mad Rock 102.5
  KMKT  Katy Country 93.1
  KDOC  HOT 107.3 FM

Television stations

 KTEN – Channel 10 (NBC)
 KTEN – DT Channel 10.2 (The Texoma CW)
 KTEN – Channel 10.3 (ABC Texoma)
 KXII – Channel 12 (CBS)
 KXII – DT Channel 12.2 (My Texoma)
 KXII – DT Channel 12.3 (Fox Texoma)

Infrastructure

Transportation
Denison is served by two U.S. Highways—U.S. 69 and U.S. 75 (Katy Memorial Expressway) and two State Highways—State Highway 91 and Spur 503 (Eisenhower Parkway). State Highway 91, known as Texoma Parkway, is one of the main commercial strips that connects Sherman and Denison. It also extends north to Lake Texoma.

General aviation service is provided by North Texas Regional Airport.

TAPS, a regional public transportation system, offers limited service for disabled passengers.

Health care
Denison is served by Texoma Medical Center.

Notable people

 Bill Anoatubby, governor of the Chickasaw Nation
 Clora Bryant, jazz trumpeter
 Joie Chitwood (1912–1988), race car driver and businessman
 Dwight D. Eisenhower, President of the United States; was born in Denison in 1890, and to date is the city's most notable resident. His birthplace was purchased by the city in 1946 (six years before he was elected President) and is now maintained as Eisenhower Birthplace State Historic Site. In addition, Eisenhower State Park on Lake Texoma is named in his honor.
 Booker Ervin, jazz musician who played tenor saxophone
Michael Haynes, NFL Hall of Fame player
 Jim Hightower, former commissioner of Texas Department of Agriculture and a liberal commentator and author, born in Denison in 1943
 John Hillerman, the actor who played Higgins on Tom Selleck's Magnum, P.I.
 John Henry "Doc" Holliday, gunfighter, gambler, and western legend, maintained a dental practice in Denison
 Aaron Hunt and Reggie Hunt, brothers and professional football players in Canadian Football League
 Viola Van Katwijk, composer and pianist
 Thomas Volney Munson, horticulturalist
 Clifford Noe, international conman and swindler
 Beatrice Pearson, actress
 SoMo, singer
 Chesley Burnett "Sully" Sullenberger, airline pilot
 Jordan Taylor, NFL wide receiver, Super Bowl 50 champion with the Denver Broncos 
 Zeb Terry, Major League Baseball infielder
 Fred Washington, NFL defensive tackle for Chicago Bears
 Harold Wertz, 1927–1999, "Bouncy" of Our Gang comedies (1932–1933)

In popular culture
In 2013, Lake Texoma and the Hampton Inn and Suites Denison were featured on a travel show entitled The Official Best of Texas, which aired on CBS and the Discovery Channel.

References

External links

 City of Denison official website
 Denison Chamber of Commerce
 

Cities in Texas
Cities in Grayson County, Texas
Populated places established in 1872
1872 establishments in Texas